Marc James Behrend (born January 11, 1961 in Madison, Wisconsin) is an American  former professional ice hockey goaltender who played 39 National Hockey League (NHL) regular season games with the Winnipeg Jets between 1984 and 1986. He was drafted by the Jets with the 85th pick overall in the 1981 NHL Entry Draft.

Playing career
Before turning professional, Behrend graduated from La Follette High School and was a member of the University of Wisconsin–Madison men's hockey team that won the NCAA championship in 1981 and 1983. Behrend was named the tournament's Most Outstanding Player on both occasions,  becoming only the second player in the history of the tournament to do so. He is also the only goaltender to play in three consecutive NCAA finals (1981–1983). He also played for the United States national hockey team in the 1984 Winter Olympics in Sarajevo before turning professional.

Post-playing career
After his hockey career, Behrend joined the City of Madison Fire Department where he worked as a 6th generation firefighter from 1988 to 2017.

Career statistics

Regular season and playoffs

International

Awards and honors

References

External links

Hockeygoalies.org profile

1961 births
Living people
American men's ice hockey goaltenders
Sportspeople from Madison, Wisconsin
Ice hockey players from Wisconsin
Ice hockey players at the 1984 Winter Olympics
NCAA men's ice hockey national champions
Olympic ice hockey players of the United States
Sherbrooke Canadiens players
Winnipeg Jets (1979–1996) draft picks
Winnipeg Jets (1979–1996) players
Wisconsin Badgers men's ice hockey players